Matthew Letley (born 29 March 1961) is an English rock drummer, formerly with the English rock band, Status Quo.

Career 
Letley attended Sir Joseph Williamson's Mathematical School, in Rochester, Kent. His first recordings, with his brother Mark's progressive rock band Sindelfingen, were made when he was only 12; a live track including him was added to a CD reissue of their rare album Odgipig (he joined after the recording of the original album). As a drummer he played for a number of well-known artists, including a-ha, Bob Geldof, Vanessa Mae, Hank Marvin and Kim Wilde. In April 2015 Matt Letley produced and recorded drum section for the song of Russian alternative rock band 208 Talks of Angels. Released 4 February 2022, Matt performed and recorded drums for Stu Allen's debut single "Falling Out of Sight".

Having joined Status Quo in 2000, his first tour with the band was in Germany. In 2006, Letley was part of Status Quo's Just Doin' It tour. After joining the band Letley often performed a drum solo, 'The Killer', as part of the song "Gerdundula". When "Gerdundula" was dropped from the Quo set, his solo was typically performed during "In the Army Now".

On 17 December 2012, Letley announced, via his website, that he would be leaving Status Quo after 12 years. His final concert was on Wednesday 19 December, at The O2 Arena as the final date of the band's winter 2012  tour.

Equipment
Letley is endorsed by Noonan Custom drums, Paiste cymbals, Remo heads, Vic Firth drumsticks and Hardcases cases.

Drums:
Noonan Custom
 24x16" Bass drum
 14x5" Snare drum
 10x8" Rack tom
 12x9" Rack tom
 14x11" Floor tom
 16x14" Floor tom

Cymbals:
Paiste
 15" Signature Sound Edge Hi-Hats
 16" 2002 crash
 17" 2002 crash
 20" 2002 Power ride
 17" 2002 Wild crash
 18" 2002 Wild crash
 19" 2002 Wild crash
 14" Rude Hi-Hats
 20" 2002 Novo china
 8"  Signature bell
 8"  2002 splash
 10" 2002 splash

Hardware:
Drum Workshop and Pearl Drums
Pearl Icon Rack with Pearl cymbal arms
DW 9000 Pedals

References

External links
Matt Letley official website

Status Quo (band) members
Living people
1961 births
English rock drummers
People educated at Sir Joseph Williamson's Mathematical School
Musicians from Kent